The 2008 United States Senate election in West Virginia was held on November 4. Incumbent Democratic U.S. Senator Jay Rockefeller won re-election to a fifth term, defeating Republican Jay Wolfe. , this is the last time that a Democrat has won West Virginia's Class 2 U.S. Senate seat.

Background 

Before the 2000 presidential election, West Virginia had been won by the Democratic nominee every time since 1932 except for the Republican landslides of 1956, 1972, and 1984. In 2000, then Republican Governor George W. Bush of Texas won West Virginia’s five electoral college votes over then Vice President Al Gore of Tennessee by a margin of 52-46. Also in the 2000 election, Republican Shelley Moore Capito, the daughter of Former West Virginia Governor Arch A. Moore, Jr., won a surprise victory over Democrat Jim Humphreys for West Virginia's 2nd Congressional District seat to the United States House of Representatives. She is the first Republican in West Virginia to hold a Congressional office for more than one term since her father (1957–1969). Before these two major victories for national and West Virginia Republicans, it was difficult to find a Republican who could mount a formidable campaign against Democrats running for public office in West Virginia.

President Bush won West Virginia again in the 2004 presidential election over John F. Kerry, the Democratic junior Senator from Massachusetts by a margin of 56-43. Both Representative Alan Mollohan (D-1st District) and Representative Nick Rahall (D-3rd District) had more formidable challenges from Republicans when compared to 2000 and 2002.

The Republicans had gained seven net seats in both the West Virginia Senate and the West Virginia House of Delegates from 2000 to 2008. However, the Democrats still held 60% of the seats in the Senate and 68% of the seats in the House.

Along with continued majorities in the legislature, Democrats had also had other recent victories. Even though both Bush and Capito won their respective offices in 2000, Senator Byrd sailed to an eighth term with 78% of the vote over Republican David Gallaher. Senator John D. Rockefeller IV easily won a fourth term to the Senate in 2002 by a margin of 63-37 over Republican former state senator Jay Wolfe. In 2000, 2002, and 2004, both Representative Mollohan and Representative Rahall were re-elected by much stronger margins than Capito. In 2004, Republican Monty Warner failed to defeat Democratic West Virginia Secretary of State Joe Manchin for governor.

After the Republicans failed to win the governor’s race, West Virginia Republican Committee Chairman Kris Warner, the brother of Monty, was put under pressure to resign his post; he did so in May 2005 . Wheeling attorney Rob Capehart took his place. (Dr. Doug McKinney of Bridgeport now holds the post.) Another brother of Monty, Kasey, who was appointed by President Bush in 2001, was removed as the United States Attorney for the Southern District of West Virginia on August 1, 2005. No explanation has been given for his departure and U.S. Attorney Lisa G. Johnston currently represents the district.

Democratic primary

Candidates 
 Jay Rockefeller
 Sheirl Fletcher
 Billy Hendricks

Results

Republican primary

Candidates 
 Jay Wolfe, former State Senator, and nominee in 1988 and 2002

Results 
Wolfe was unopposed for the Republican nomination.

General election

Candidates 
 Jay Rockefeller (D), incumbent U.S. Senator
 Jay Wolfe (R), former State Senator

Predictions

Polling

Results

See also 
 2008 United States Senate elections

References

External links 
 Elections from the West Virginia Secretary of State
 U.S. Congress candidates for West Virginia at Project Vote Smart
 West Virginia, U.S. Senate from CQ Politics
 West Virginia U.S. Senate from OurCampaigns.com
 West Virginia U.S. Senate race from 2008 Race Tracker
 Campaign contributions from OpenSecrets
 Official campaign websites (Archived)
 Jay Rockefeller, Democratic candidate
 Jay Wolfe, Republican candidate

2008
West Virginia
United States Senate